Alexy Bosetti (born 23 April 1993) is a French professional footballer who plays as a striker for  club FC Annecy.

Early life
Alexy Bosetti was born in 1993 to a Niçois family of Italian origins. He is the great grandnephew of the composer and pianist Henri Betti and of the opera singer Freda Betti.

Club career

Early career
A member of the Populaire Sud since his early years as a native of Vieux-Nice, the young striker was a member of the Cavigal Nice Sports and J.S.O Villefranche-sur-Mer youth academies before committing to Nice. An excellent dribbler, Bosetti has since played as either an attacking midfielder or a striker. He won the 2011–2012 edition of the Coupe Gambardella with U19 team of Nice on 28 April 2012.

Nice
Bosetti made his professional debut with Nice on 20 May 2012 in a league match against Lyon making a substitute appearance in the 86th minute of play. He scored his first professional goal against Montpellier in the quarter finals of the 19th edition of the Coupe de la Ligue on 28 November 2012. On 6 April 2013, at Stadium Municipal, he collected the first red card of his career after a tackle on Cheikh M'Bengue of Toulouse.

On 22 September 2013, Bosetti became the first native of Nice to score a goal at the Allianz Riviera during the inaugural match against Valenciennes. On 13 September 2014, he scored a stoppage-time winner in a 1–0 home victory over Metz.

Loan to Tours
On 15 July 2015, Bosetti joined Tours on loan, without an option to buy. He scored a goal in his first friendly, securing a 1–1 draw against Niort on 24 July 2015. On 21 August 2015, Bosetti scored his first official goal for Tours, helping his side to a 3–1 victory over Auxerre.

Loan to Sarpsborg 08
In January 2016, Bosetti joined Norwegian side Sarpsborg 08 on loan until the end of season. He scored for Sarpsborg 08 on 13 April 2016 in a 5–0 victory over Ås in a Norwegian Cup match. His loan was cut short early in April after playing in just two league matches in three months with the club. Having been loaned out to Tours in the first half the season, he was not eligible to play for Nice during the rest of the season.

Return to Nice
After a short loan spell he returned to Nice, but did not feature regularly for the first team. On 8 December 2016, he scored his first goal in Europe for Nice, helping the club to a 2–1 win over Krasnodar in a Europa League match. During the 2016–17 season he played primarily for Nice II, scoring 10 goals in 21 appearances in the Championnat de France Amateur.

He left the club at the end of his contract in summer 2017.

Laval
In August 2017, free agent Bosetti joined third-tier side Laval on a one-year contract with the option of another year in case of promotion to Ligue 2.

OKC Energy FC
On 24 January 2019, Bosetti moved to the United States when he joined second-tier USL Championship side OKC Energy FC.

El Paso Locomotive
On 15 August 2019, Bosetti was traded to El Paso Locomotive in exchange for Derek Gebhard. On 28 June 2020, it was announced that Bosetti and the Locomotive had mutually agreed to part ways.

Return to France 
On 3 August 2020, Bosetti joined French club Le Puy.

On 28 June 2021, Bosetti signed with Annecy.

International career
On 13 July 2013, 15 years and one day after the victory of France at the 1998 FIFA World Cup, Bosetti won the 2013 FIFA U-20 World Cup with the France U-20 team. The final in Istanbul against Uruguay was decided in a penally shootout with France winning 4–1.

Career statistics

Honours
Nice U19
 Coupe Gambardella: 2011–12
France U20
 FIFA U-20 World Cup: 2013

References

External links
 
 
 
 francefootball.fr

1993 births
Living people
French sportspeople of Italian descent
People of Emilian descent
Footballers from Nice
Association football forwards
El Paso Locomotive FC players
USL Championship players
French footballers
French expatriates in the United States
France youth international footballers
Expatriate footballers in Norway
OGC Nice players
OKC Energy FC players
Sarpsborg 08 FF players
Tours FC players
Stade Lavallois players
Le Puy Foot 43 Auvergne players
FC Annecy players
Ligue 1 players
Ligue 2 players
Eliteserien players
Championnat National players
Championnat National 2 players
Championnat National 3 players